In visual arts, music and other media, minimalism is an art movement that began in post–World War II in Western art, most strongly with American visual arts in the 1960s and early 1970s. Prominent artists associated with minimalism include Donald Judd, Agnes Martin, Dan Flavin, Carl Andre, Robert Morris, Anne Truitt and Frank Stella. The movement is often interpreted as a reaction against abstract expressionism and modernism; it anticipated contemporary postminimal art practices, which extend or reflect on minimalism's original objectives.

Minimalism in music often features repetition and gradual variation, such as the works of La Monte Young, Terry Riley, Steve Reich, Philip Glass, Julius Eastman and John Adams. The term minimalist often colloquially refers to anything or anyone that is spare or stripped to its essentials. It has accordingly been used to describe the plays and novels of Samuel Beckett, the films of Robert Bresson, the stories of Raymond Carver, and the automobile designs of Colin Chapman. The word was first used in English in the early 20th century to describe a 1915 composition by the Russian painter Kasimir Malevich, Black Square.

Visual arts 

Minimalism in visual art, generally referred to as "minimal art", "literalist art"  and "ABC Art", emerged in New York in the early 1960s as new and older artists moved toward geometric abstraction; exploring via painting in the cases of Nassos Daphnis, Frank Stella, Kenneth Noland, Al Held, Ellsworth Kelly, Robert Ryman and others; and sculpture in the works of various artists including David Smith and Anthony Caro. Judd's sculpture was showcased in 1964 at Green Gallery in Manhattan, as were Flavin's first fluorescent light works, while other leading Manhattan galleries like Leo Castelli Gallery and Pace Gallery also began to showcase artists focused on geometric abstraction.

In a more broad and general sense, one finds European roots of minimalism in the geometric abstractions of painters associated with the Bauhaus, in the works of Kazimir Malevich, Piet Mondrian and other artists associated with the De Stijl movement, and the Russian Constructivist movement, and in the work of the Romanian sculptor Constantin Brâncuși.

Minimal art is also inspired in part by the paintings of Barnett Newman, Ad Reinhardt, Josef Albers, and the works of artists as diverse as Pablo Picasso, Marcel Duchamp, Giorgio Morandi, and others. Minimalism was also a reaction against the painterly subjectivity of Abstract Expressionism that had been dominant in the New York School during the 1940s and 1950s.

Yves Klein had painted monochromes as early as 1949, and held the first private exhibition of this work in 1950—but his first public showing was the publication of the Artist's book Yves: Peintures in November 1954.

Design, architecture, and spaces 

The term minimalism is also used to describe a trend in design and architecture, wherein the subject is reduced to its necessary elements. Minimalist architectural designers focus on the connection between two perfect planes, elegant lighting, and the void spaces left by the removal of three-dimensional shapes in an architectural design. Minimalist architecture became popular in the late 1980s in London and New York, where architects and fashion designers worked together in the boutiques to achieve simplicity, using white elements, cold lighting, and large space with minimum objects and furniture.

Minimalistic design has been highly influenced by Japanese traditional design and architecture. The works of De Stijl artists are a major reference: De Stijl expanded the ideas of expression by meticulously organizing basic elements such as lines and planes. With regard to home design, more attractive "minimalistic" designs are not truly minimalistic because they are larger, and use more expensive building materials and finishes.

There are observers who describe the emergence of minimalism as a response to the brashness and chaos of urban life. In Japan, for example, minimalist architecture began to gain traction in the 1980s when its cities experienced rapid expansion and booming population. The design was considered an antidote to the "overpowering presence of traffic, advertising, jumbled building scales, and imposing roadways." The chaotic environment was not only driven by urbanization, industrialization, and technology but also the Japanese experience of constantly having to demolish structures on account of the destruction wrought by World War II and the earthquakes, including the calamities it entails such as fire. The minimalist design philosophy did not arrive in Japan by way of another country, as it was already part of the Japanese culture rooted on the Zen philosophy. There are those who specifically attribute the design movement to Japan's spirituality and view of nature.

Architect Ludwig Mies van der Rohe (1886–1969) adopted the motto "Less is more" to describe his aesthetic. His tactic was one of arranging the necessary components of a building to create an impression of extreme simplicity—he enlisted every element and detail to serve multiple visual and functional purposes; for example, designing a floor to also serve as the radiator, or a massive fireplace to also house the bathroom. Designer Buckminster Fuller (1895–1983) adopted the engineer's goal of "Doing more with less", but his concerns were oriented toward technology and engineering rather than aesthetics.

Concepts and design elements 
The concept of minimalist architecture is to strip everything down to its essential quality and achieve simplicity. The idea is not completely without ornamentation, but that all parts, details, and joinery are considered as reduced to a stage where no one can remove anything further to improve the design.

The considerations for 'essences' are light, form, detail of material, space, place, and human condition. Minimalist architects not only consider the physical qualities of the building. They consider the spiritual dimension and the invisible, by listening to the figure and paying attention to details, people, space, nature, and materials., believing this reveals the abstract quality of something that is invisible and aids the search for the essence of those invisible qualities—such as natural light, sky, earth, and air. In addition, they "open a dialogue" with the surrounding environment to decide the most essential materials for the construction and create relationships between buildings and sites.

In minimalist architecture, design elements strive to convey the message of simplicity. The basic geometric forms, elements without decoration, simple materials and the repetitions of structures represent a sense of order and essential quality. The movement of natural light in buildings reveals simple and clean spaces. In the late 19th century as the arts and crafts movement became popular in Britain, people valued the attitude of 'truth to materials' with respect to the profound and innate characteristics of materials. Minimalist architects humbly 'listen to figure,' seeking essence and simplicity by rediscovering the valuable qualities in simple and common materials.

Influences from Japanese tradition 

The idea of simplicity appears in many cultures, especially the Japanese traditional culture of Zen Buddhist philosophy. Japanese manipulate the Zen culture into aesthetic and design elements for their buildings. This idea of architecture has influenced Western society, especially in America since the mid 18th century. Moreover, it inspired the minimalist architecture in the 19th century.

Zen concepts of simplicity transmit the ideas of freedom and essence of living. Simplicity is not only aesthetic value, it has a moral perception that looks into the nature of truth and reveals the inner qualities and essence of materials and objects. For example, the sand garden in  temple demonstrates the concepts of simplicity and the essentiality from the considered setting of a few stones and a huge empty space.

The Japanese aesthetic principle of  refers to empty or open space. It removes all the unnecessary internal walls and opens up the space. The emptiness of spatial arrangement reduces everything down to the most essential quality.

The Japanese aesthetic of  values the quality of simple and plain objects. It appreciates the absence of unnecessary features, treasures a life in quietness and aims to reveal the innate character of materials. For example, the Japanese floral art of  has the central principle of letting the flower express itself. People cut off the branches, leaves and blossoms from the plants and only retain the essential part of the plant. This conveys the idea of essential quality and innate character in nature.

Minimalist architects and their works 
The Japanese minimalist architect Tadao Ando conveys the Japanese traditional spirit and his own perception of nature in his works. His design concepts are materials, pure geometry and nature. He normally uses concrete or natural wood and basic structural form to achieve austerity and rays of light in space. He also sets up dialogue between the site and nature to create relationship and order with the buildings. Ando's works and the translation of Japanese aesthetic principles are highly influential on Japanese architecture.

Another Japanese minimalist architect, Kazuyo Sejima, works on her own and in conjunction with Ryue Nishizawa, as SANAA, producing iconic Japanese Minimalist buildings. Credited with creating and influencing a particular genre of Japanese Minimalism, Sejimas delicate, intelligent designs may use white color, thin construction sections and transparent elements to create the phenomenal building type often associated with minimalism. Works include New Museum (2010) New York City, Small House (2000) Tokyo, House surrounded By Plum Trees (2003) Tokyo.

In Vitra Conference Pavilion, Weil am Rhein, 1993, the concepts are to bring together the relationships between building, human movement, site and nature. Which as one main point of minimalism ideology that establish dialogue between the building and site. The building uses the simple forms of circle and rectangle to contrast the filled and void space of the interior and nature. In the foyer, there is a large landscape window that looks out to the exterior. This achieves the simple and silence of architecture and enhances the light, wind, time and nature in space.

John Pawson is a British minimalist architect; his design concepts are soul, light, and order. He believes that though reduced clutter and simplification of the interior to a point that gets beyond the idea of essential quality, there is a sense of clarity and richness of simplicity instead of emptiness. The materials in his design reveal the perception toward space, surface, and volume. Moreover, he likes to use natural materials because of their aliveness, sense of depth and quality of an individual. He is also attracted by the important influences from Japanese Zen Philosophy.

Calvin Klein Madison Avenue, New York, 1995–96, is a boutique that conveys Calvin Klein's ideas of fashion. John Pawson's interior design concepts for this project are to create simple, peaceful and orderly spatial arrangements. He used stone floors and white walls to achieve simplicity and harmony for space. He also emphasises reduction and eliminates the visual distortions, such as the air conditioning  and lamps, to achieve a sense of purity for the interior.

Alberto Campo Baeza is a Spanish architect and describes his work as essential architecture. He values the concepts of light, idea and space. Light is essential and achieves the relationship between inhabitants and the building. Ideas are to meet the function and context of space, forms, and construction. Space is shaped by the minimal geometric forms to avoid decoration that is not essential.

Literature 

Literary minimalism is characterized by an economy with words and a focus on surface description. Minimalist writers eschew adverbs and prefer allowing context to dictate meaning. Readers are expected to take an active role in creating the story, to "choose sides" based on oblique hints and innuendo, rather than react to directions from the writer.

Some 1940s-era crime fiction of writers such as James M. Cain and Jim Thompson adopted a stripped-down, matter-of-fact prose style to considerable effect; some classify this prose style as minimalism.

Another strand of literary minimalism arose in response to the metafiction trend of the 1960s and early 1970s (John Barth, Robert Coover, and William H. Gass). These writers were also sparse with prose and kept a psychological distance from their subject matter.

Minimalist writers, or those who are identified with minimalism during certain periods of their writing careers, include the following: Raymond Carver, Ann Beattie, Bret Easton Ellis, Charles Bukowski, Ernest Hemingway, K. J. Stevens, Amy Hempel, Bobbie Ann Mason, Tobias Wolff, Grace Paley, Sandra Cisneros, Mary Robison, Frederick Barthelme, Richard Ford, Patrick Holland, Cormac McCarthy, and Alicia Erian.

American poets such as Stephen Crane, William Carlos Williams, early Ezra Pound, Robert Creeley, Robert Grenier, and Aram Saroyan are sometimes identified with their minimalist style. The term "minimalism" is also sometimes associated with the briefest of poetic genres, haiku, which originated in Japan, but has been domesticated in English literature by poets such as Nick Virgilio, Raymond Roseliep, and George Swede.

The Irish writer Samuel Beckett is well known for his minimalist plays and prose, as is the Norwegian writer Jon Fosse.

Dimitris Lyacos's With the People from the Bridge, combining elliptical monologues with a pared-down prose narrative, is a contemporary example of minimalist playwrighting.

In his novel The Easy Chain, Evan Dara includes a 60-page section written in the style of musical minimalism, in particular inspired by composer Steve Reich. Intending to represent the psychological state (agitation) of the novel's main character, the section's successive lines of text are built on repetitive and developing phrases.

Music 

The term "minimal music" was derived around 1970 by Michael Nyman from the concept of minimalism, which was earlier applied to the visual arts. More precisely, it was in a 1968 review in The Spectator that Nyman first used the term, to describe a ten-minute piano composition by the Danish composer Henning Christiansen, along with several other unnamed pieces played by Charlotte Moorman and Nam June Paik at the Institute of Contemporary Arts in London.

However, the roots of minimal music are older. In France between 1947 and 1948, Yves Klein conceived his Monotone Symphony (1949, formally The Monotone-Silence Symphony) that consisted of a single 20-minute sustained chord followed by a 20-minute silence – a precedent to both La Monte Young's drone music and John Cage's 4′33″.

Film and cinema 
In film, minimalism usually is associated with filmmakers such as Robert Bresson, Chantal Akerman, Carl Theodor Dreyer, and Yasujirō Ozu. Their films typically tell a simple story with straightforward camera usage and minimal use of score. Paul Schrader named their kind of cinema: "transcendental cinema". In the present, a commitment to minimalist filmmaking can be seen in film movements such as Dogme 95, mumblecore, and the Romanian New Wave. Abbas Kiarostami,Elia Suleiman, and Kelly Reichardt are also considered minimalist filmmakers. 

The Minimalists – Joshua Fields Millburn, Ryan Nicodemus, and Matt D'Avella – directed and produced the film Minimalism: A Documentary, which showcased the idea of minimal living in the modern world.

In other fields

Cooking 
Breaking from the complex, hearty dishes established as orthodox haute cuisine, nouvelle cuisine was a culinary movement that consciously drew from minimalism and conceptualism. It emphasized more basic flavors, careful presentation, and a less involved preparation process. The movement was mainly in vogue during the 1960s and 1970s, after which it once again gave way to more traditional haute cuisine, retroactively titled cuisine classique. However, the influence of nouvelle cuisine can still be felt through the techniques it introduced.

Fashion 
The capsule wardrobe is an example of minimalism in fashion. Constructed of only a few staple pieces that do not go out of style, and generally dominated by only one or two colors, capsule wardrobes are meant to be light, flexible and adaptable, and can be paired with seasonal pieces when the situation calls for them. The modern idea of a capsule wardrobe dates back to the 1970s, and is credited to London boutique owner Susie Faux. The concept was further popularized in the next decade by American fashion designer Donna Karan, who designed a seminal collection of capsule workwear pieces in 1985.

Science communication 

To portray global warming to non-scientists, in 2018 British climate scientist Ed Hawkins developed warming stripes graphics that are deliberately devoid of scientific or technical indicia, for ease of understanding by non-scientists. Hawkins explained that "our visual system will do the interpretation of the stripes without us even thinking about it".

Warming stripe graphics resemble color field paintings in stripping out all distractions and using only color to convey meaning. Color field pioneer artist Barnett Newman said he was "creating images whose reality is self-evident", an ethos that Hawkins is said to have applied to the problem of climate change and leading one commentator to remark that the graphics are "fit for the Museum of Modern Art or the Getty."

A visual form of global warming data is presented through knitted or crocheted work. This project known as  "tempestry" and it is carried out by collaborating with many artists to show the variations in  temperatures using specified colors of yarn for each temperature or temperature range. The whole tapestry gives visual representation of global warming that may be taking place at a given location. The word "tempestry" is a portmanteau of "temperature" and "tapestry."

Minimalist lifestyle 

In a lifestyle adopting minimalism, there is an effort to use materials which are most essential and in quantities that do not exceed certain limits imposed by the user themselves. There have been so many terms evolved from the concept. Like minimalist decors, minimalist skincare, minimalist style, minimalist accessories, etc. All such terms signify the usage of only essential products in that niche into our lives. This will help to focus on things that are important in one's life. It will save resources from going waste if excess quantities are bought. It will also save the time of acquiring the excess materials that may be found unnecessary.

A minimalist lifestyle helps to enjoy life with simple things that are available without undue efforts to acquire things that may be bought at great expenses. Minimalism also leads to less clutter in living spaces.

See also

Notes and references

Notes

References

Sources

Further reading
 
 Keenan, David, and Michael Nyman (4 February 2001). "Claim to Frame". Sunday Herald

External links 

 
 Agence Photographique de la Réunion des musées nationaux et du Grand Palais des Champs-Elysées
 "A Short History of Minimalism—Donald Judd, Richard Wollheim, and the origins of what we now describe as minimalist" By Kyle Chayka January 14, 2020 The Nation

 
Contemporary art movements
Modern art
Abstract art
Western art
Modernism
Simple living
1960s in art
1970s in art
Postmodern art
Postmodernism